Gliese 758 is a star in the northern constellation of Lyra. At about magnitude 6 it is a challenge to view with the naked eye even in good seeing conditions, but can be easily seen through a small telescope or binoculars.

Properties
This is a Sun-like star with 97% of the Sun's mass and 88% of the radius of the Sun. The spectrum matches a stellar classification of G8V, identifying it as a G-type main-sequence star that is generating energy through the nuclear fusion of hydrogen at its core. Estimates of its age put it at about 7.7–8.7 billion years old, although some measurements give it an age as low as 720 million years. The abundance of elements other than hydrogen and helium, what astronomers term the star's metallicity, are 51% higher than in the Sun.

Companion
In November 2009, a team using the HiCIAO instrument of the Subaru Telescope imaged a substellar companion orbiting the star. This brown dwarf, designated Gliese 758 B, was estimated to be of approximately 10 to 40 Jupiter masses. A second candidate object was also detected, which was given the designation Gliese 758 C. Follow-up studies of the system refined the mass range of Gliese 758 B, indicating it to be a companion with approximately 30 to 40 Jupiter masses, and revealed that Gliese 758 C is a background star which is not physically associated with the Gliese 758 system. On the other hand, a younger age was suggested from the kinematic stellar grouping.

The most recent parameters for Gliese 758 B as of 2022 come from a combination of data from radial velocity, astrometry, and imaging, showing that it is about 36 times the mass of Jupiter, and on an eccentric orbit with a semi-major axis of about 25.4 astronomical units and an orbital period of about 131 years.

See also
 Direct imaging of extrasolar planets
 Lists of exoplanets

References

External links
Animation of GJ 758 system compared to Solar System

182488
095319
0758
Binary stars
Lyra (constellation)
G-type main-sequence stars
Durchmusterung objects
7368